The SQL From clause is the source of a rowset to be operated upon in a Data Manipulation Language (DML) statement.  From clauses are very common, and will provide the rowset to be exposed through a Select statement, the source of values in an Update statement, and the target rows to be deleted in a Delete statement. 

FROM is an SQL reserved word in the SQL standard. 

The FROM clause is used in conjunction with SQL statements, and takes the following general form:

  SQL-DML-Statement
  FROM table_name 
  WHERE predicate

The From clause can generally be anything that returns a rowset, a table, view, function, or system-provided information like the Information Schema, which is typically running proprietary commands and returning the information in a table form.

Examples

The following query returns only those rows from table mytable where the value in column mycol is greater than 100.

SELECT *
FROM   mytable
WHERE  mycol > 100

Requirement
The From clause is technically required in relational algebra and in most scenarios to be useful.  However many relational DBMS implementations may not require it for selecting a single value, or single row - known as DUAL table in Oracle database.
SELECT 3.14 AS Pi
Other systems will require a From statement with a keyword, even to select system data.  
select to_char(sysdate, 'Dy DD-Mon-YYYY HH24:MI:SS') as "Current Time"
from dual;

References

SQL keywords
Articles with example SQL code